Smedjebacken Municipality (Smedjebackens kommun) is a municipality in Dalarna County in central Sweden. Its seat is located in the town of Smedjebacken.

The present municipality was formed in two steps during the last nationwide local government reform in Sweden. In 1967 the market town (köping) Smedjebacken was reunited with Norrbärke from which it had been detached in 1918. In 1974 Söderbärke was added.

The municipality borders to eight other municipalities.

The coat of arms depicts a sailing ship and cogwheels. These are intended to show the old and new industry sectors of the municipality. It was first granted 1947, but has undergone a few redesigns since. In Smedjebacken there is a skiingclub NSKalpin.com which has a live webcamera from the slope. Also close by is Lernbo where the biggest sportsfishing retailer in Europe has its headquarters.

Localities
 Gubbo
 Hagge
 Ludvika (minor part)
 Smedjebacken (seat)
 Söderbärke
 Vad

Riksdag elections

Notable natives 
Jussi Björling, tenor
Lars Frölander, swimmer
Mando Diao, rock band
Sugarplum Fairy, pop band
Per Fosshaug, bandy player
Dozer, stoner rock band
Erik Eriksson, Centre Party's first chairman
Lars Jonsson, ice hockey player
Sator, rock band
Nadja Brandt, writer and also appeared as an extra in Twilight
Linda Carlsson, musician (also known as Miss Li)
Tove Alexandersson, orienteering, ski-orienteering and skyrunning world champion
Per Johansson, swimmer

References

External links

Smedjebacken Municipality – Official site

Municipalities of Dalarna County